The Brussels effect is the process of unilateral regulatory globalisation caused by the European Union de facto (but not necessarily de jure) externalising its laws outside its borders through market mechanisms. Through the Brussels effect, regulated entities, especially corporations, end up complying with EU laws even outside the EU for a variety of reasons.

Etymology 
The term Brussels effect was coined in 2012 by Professor Anu Bradford of Columbia Law School and named after the similar California effect that can be seen within the United States.

Cause 
The combination of market size, market importance, relatively stringent standards and regulatory capacity of the European Union can have the effect that firms trading internationally find that it is not economically, legally or technically practical to maintain lower standards in non-EU markets. Non-EU companies exporting globally can find that it is beneficial to adopt standards set in Brussels uniformly throughout their business.

Effect 
The California effect and the Brussels effect are a form of "race to the top" where the most stringent standard has an appeal to companies operating across multiple regulatory environments as it makes global production and exports easier. The effects are the opposite of the Delaware effect, a race to the bottom where jurisdictions can purposefully choose to lower their regulatory requirements in an attempt to attract businesses looking for the least stringent standard.

Scholars could so far not empirically verify the limits of the Brussels Effect in international law, especially World Trade Organization (WTO) law. Furthermore, for the Brussels effect to occur, it was shown that not all prerequisites identified by Bradford have to occur cumulatively. Research has indicated that the EU's regulatory power varies substantially depending on the context of the regulation involved.

Examples

Antitrust
The October 2000 $42 billion proposed acquisition of US-based Honeywell by US-based General Electric was blocked by the EU antitrust authorities on the grounds of risking a horizontal monopoly in jet engines. The merger could not proceed because, despite the American Department of Justice having already approved the merger between these two US-based entities, it was not legally possible to let the acquisition proceed in one important market, but not in another.

Chemicals
US-based multinational Dow Chemical announced in 2006 it would comply with the EU's Registration, Evaluation, Authorisation and Restriction of Chemicals (REACH) regulation for the production and use of chemical substances across its global operation.

Airplane emissions
In 2012 the EU included aviation into its existing Emission Trading Scheme. This means that any airline, regardless of their country of origin, has to purchase emissions permits for any flights within the European Economic Area. The cost of complying with EU aviation emission regulation puts pressure on manufacturers to design airplanes with improved efficiency and reduced emissions. As major airlines would not likely purchase airplanes specifically to fly outside the EEA, the EU's stricter aviation standards have an impact on global airplane fleets, regardless of the jurisdiction of the airline.

Data protection and privacy
With the introduction of the Data Protection Directive in 1995 the EU had opted for a strict top-down approach to data privacy. Its successor, the EU's General Data Protection Regulation (GDPR), was adopted on 14 April 2016 and had a global effect. In 2017, during negotiations for a new Japan-EU trade deal, Japan set up an independent agency to handle privacy complaints to conform with the EU's new privacy regulation.

Facebook announced in April 2018 that it would implement parts of the GDPR globally. Sonos announced in April 2018 that it would implement the GDPR globally, and Microsoft announced in May 2018 that it would implement GDPR compliance for all its customers globally.

Exploitation of natural resources
The Brussels effect can be observed in two regulatory frameworks that regulate the exploitation of natural resources, the Conflict Minerals Regulation and Country by Country Reporting Rules for payments to governments.

Consumer electronics 
In October 2022 the European Parliament adopted a directive which required many consumer electronic devices - notably mobile phones - to use a common external power supply by 2024. This was seen as being particularly applicable to Apple and its iPhone product range which had hitherto steadfastly rejected standardisation. The expectation was that, due to the EU's large marketplace, the EU-specific regulation would nonetheless result a change in how products were manufactured for sale in other countries (to ensure a single global product), and that other jurisdictions would adopt equivalent legislation.

See also

References 

Global governance